The French submarine Artémis was one of eight s built for the French Navy during the 1910s and completed during World War I. She was launched on 14 October 1914.

See also 
List of submarines of France

Notes

Bibliography

 

Amphitrite-class submarines
1914 ships
Ships built in France